Danie van Schalkwyk  (born 1 February 1975) is a South African former rugby union player.

Playing career
Van Schalkwyk made his test debut for the Springboks in 1996 against  at Loftus Versfeld in Pretoria, scoring a try on debut. He then played in three test matches during the New Zealand tour of South Africa in 1996. He played a further four Test matches in 1997, after which he did not make the Sprinbok team again.

Test history

See also
List of South Africa national rugby union players – Springbok no. 631

References

1975 births
Living people
South African rugby union players
South Africa international rugby union players
Blue Bulls players
Bulls (rugby union) players
Rugby union players from Gauteng
Rugby union centres